The La Fuentecilla is a fountain located in Madrid, Spain. It was declared Bien de Interés Cultural in 1996.

References 

Buildings and structures in Embajadores neighborhood, Madrid
Bien de Interés Cultural landmarks in Madrid